Steam of Life is a Finnish documentary film about male saunas directed by Joonas Berghäll and Mika Hotakainen. The movie was produced by Joonas Berghäll. It opened theatrically in New York City on 30 July 2010 and opened in Los Angeles on 6 August 2010 at the 14th Annual DocuWeeks.

It was selected as the Finnish entry for the Best Foreign Language Film at the 83rd Academy Awards, but it didn't make the final shortlist. It is the first documentary film to represent Finland at the Academy Awards. It was also nominated for "Best Documentary" at the 23rd European Film Awards.

It won the Best International Cinematography at the Documentary Edge Festival in New Zealand in 2011.

See also
 List of submissions to the 83rd Academy Awards for Best Foreign Language Film
 List of Finnish submissions for the Academy Award for Best Foreign Language Film

References

External links
 Official website
 Variety review
 
 
 
 
 Twenty films that make men cry at BBC News

2010 films
2010s Finnish-language films
Finnish documentary films
2010 documentary films
Sauna